At the 1972 Summer Olympics in Munich, four diving events were contested during a competition that took place at the Olympiapark Swimming Hall, from 27 August to 4 September (31 August, rest day), comprising 91 divers from 25 nations.

Medal summary
The events are named according to the International Olympic Committee, but they appeared on the official report as "springboard diving" and "platform diving", respectively.

Men

Women

Medal table

Participating nations
Here are listed the nations that were represented in the diving events and, in brackets, the number of national competitors.

See also
 Diving at the 1971 Pan American Games

Notes

References
 
 

 
1972 Summer Olympics events
1972
1972 in water sports